The 2021 Big South Conference men's soccer tournament was the postseason men's soccer tournament for the Big South Conference held from November 7 through November 14, 2021. The tournament was hosted on the campus of the higher seed each game. The six-team single-elimination tournament consisted of three rounds based on seeding from regular season conference play. High Point were the defending champions. The conference tournament title was the seventh for the Campbell men's soccer program and the third for head coach Dustin Fonder. The title was Campbell's third in the last four years and their seven titles is two more than any other Big South men's soccer program. As tournament champions, Campbell earned the Big South's automatic berth into the 2021 NCAA Division I men's soccer tournament.

Seeding 
The top six teams in the regular season earned a spot in the tournament.  Teams were seeded based on regular season conference record and tiebreakers were used to determine seedings of teams that finished with the same record.  All games were hosted by the higher seed.  The top two seeds also earned a bye into the quarterfinals.  No tiebreakers were required as each team finished with a unique conference record.

Bracket

Source:

Schedule

First round

Semifinals

Final

Statistics

Goalscorers

All-Tournament team

Source:

MVP in bold

References 

2021 Big South Conference men's soccer season
Big South Conference Men's Soccer Tournament